Psalm 8 is the eighth psalm of the Book of Psalms, beginning and ending in English in the King James Version (KJV): "O LORD, our Lord, how excellent is thy name in all the earth!". In Latin, it is known as "Domine Dominus noster". Its authorship is traditionally assigned to King David. Like Psalms 81 and 84, this psalm opens with a direction to the chief musician to perform upon the gittith, which either refers to a musical instrument, a style of performance, or alludes to persons and places in biblical history.

Commentator Cyril Rodd describes this as a "well-known and greatly loved psalm ... usually classified as a hymn". It forms a regular part of Jewish, Catholic, Lutheran, Anglican and other Protestant liturgies. It has often been set to music, and has inspired hymns such as "For the  Beauty of the Earth" and "How Great Thou Art".

Background and themes
Like Psalms 81 and 84, Psalm 8 opens with a direction to the chief musician to perform upon the gittit. The New King James Version calls it "the instrument of Gath". The Hebrew root  refers to a winepress, indicating that these are joyful psalms. The word may also refer to the biblical city of Gath, where a similar song was sung or a musical instrument was created; or to a song of Obed-Edom the Gittite, in whose home the Ark of the Covenant rested for three months (II Samuel 6:11); or to a song over Goliath, who was from Gath.

Charles Spurgeon calls this psalm "the song of the Astronomer", as gazing at the heavens (verse 3 in KJV) inspires the psalmist to meditate on God's creation and man's place in it. Spurgeon further interprets the "babes and sucklings" to whom the Lord gives strength (verse 2 in KJV) as referring variously to man, David, Jesus, the apostles, and all "who fight under Christ's banner".

According to the Midrash Tehillim, verses 5 through 10 in the Hebrew contain questions that the angels asked God as God was creating the world, referring to the righteous men of Israel:
"What is man that You are mindful of him"—referring to Abraham (see Genesis 19:29);
"and the son of man that You remember him"—referring to Abraham's son Isaac, who was born as a result of God remembering Sarah (ibid. 21:1);
"Yet You made him less only than God"—referring to Jacob, who was able to produce streaked, speckled, and spotted flocks (ibid. 30:39);
"And have crowned him with glory and honor"—referring to Moses, whose face shone (Exodus 34:29);
"You give him dominion over the work of Your hands"—referring to Joshua, who made the sun and moon stand still (Joshua 10:12-13);
"You put all things beneath his feet"—referring to David, whose enemies fell before him (II Samuel 22:43);
"Sheep and oxen, all of them"—referring to Solomon, who understood the language of beasts (I Kings 5:13);
"and the beasts of the field"—referring to either Samson or Daniel;
"the birds of the sky"—referring to Elijah, who navigates the world like a bird, and who also received food from the ravens (I Kings 17:6);
"and the fish of the seas"—referring to Jonah, who dwelled in the belly of a fish (Jonah 2:1).
"he traverses the ways of the seas"—referring to the Israelites who walked through the sea on dry land (Exodus 15:19).
"O Lord, our Lord how glorious is Your name in all the earth"—thus the angels concluded, "Do what pleases You. Your glory is to sojourn with Your people and with Your children".

Text

Hebrew Bible version
Following is the Hebrew text of Psalm 8:

King James Version 
 O , our Lord, how excellent is thy name in all the earth! who hast set thy glory above the heavens.
 Out of the mouth of babes and sucklings hast thou ordained strength because of thine enemies, that thou mightest still the enemy and the avenger.
 When I consider thy heavens, the work of thy fingers, the moon and the stars, which thou hast ordained;
 What is man, that thou art mindful of him? and the son of man, that thou visitest him?
 For thou hast made him a little lower than the angels, and hast crowned him with glory and honour.
 Thou madest him to have dominion over the works of thy hands; thou hast put all things under his feet:
 All sheep and oxen, yea, and the beasts of the field;
 The fowl of the air, and the fish of the sea, and whatsoever passeth through the paths of the seas.
 O  our Lord, how excellent is thy name in all the earth!

Uses

Judaism
Psalm 8 is said during Yom Kippur Katan. In the Gra siddur, Psalm 8 is the Song of the Day for Simchat Torah in the Diaspora. In the Siddur Avodas Yisrael, this psalm is said after Aleinu during the weekday evening prayer.

Verse 2 (in the Hebrew) is recited during the Kedushah of Mussaf on Rosh Hashanah and Jewish holidays. This verse also appears in the Hoshanot on Sukkot.

Verse 10 (in the Hebrew) appears as the corresponding verse for the second mention of the name "Adonai" in the Priestly Blessing.

New Testament
Some verses of Psalm 8 are referenced in the New Testament:
Verse 2 is quoted by Jesus in Matthew  in reference to children praising him in the temple.
Verses 4-6 are quoted in Hebrews  in reference to Jesus' incarnation.
Verse 6 is quoted in 1 Corinthians ; Ephesians 

If the first Adam was set over the animal kingdom to work it and bring order, the second Adam, Jesus, brings order even to 'beastly acting kingdoms in his reign and return. His kingdom in contrast with theirs and brings a greater order and peace.

Catholic Church
According to the Rule of Saint Benedict, this psalm was sung or recited on Tuesday at the office of prime.

In the Liturgy of the Hours, the psalm is recited to Lauds on Saturday of second and in the fourth week. It often appears in the Eucharistic liturgy: it is found in the feast of the Trinity, the Easter octave, the first Tuesday of Ordinary Time, the 5th Tuesday of Ordinary Time and the 28th Saturday in Ordinary Time.

Pope Paul VI cited this psalm in his message on the Apollo 11 goodwill disk.

Book of Common Prayer
In the Church of England's Book of Common Prayer, Psalm 8 is appointed to be read on the evening of the first day of the month.

Musical settings 

Psalm 8 inspired hymn lyrics such as Folliott Sandford Pierpoint's "For the  Beauty of the Earth" which first appeared in 1864 and "How Great Thou Art", based on a Swedish poem written by Carl Boberg in 1885. 

Heinrich Schütz wrote a setting of a paraphrase in German, "Mit Dank wir sollen loben", SWV 104, for the Becker Psalter, published first in 1628.Michel Richard Delalande, composer of King Louis XIV, wrote an extended Latin motet setting this psalm, which was performed at the Royal Chapel of Versailles for royal offices. Marc-Antoine Charpentier compose around 1670s one "Domine Deus noster" for 3 voices, 2 treble instruments, and continuo, H.163.

Gospel singer Richard Smallwood set a version to music in 1990. In 2019, Seth Pinnock & A New Thing recorded a song entitled Psalms 8 which is featured as the first track on the Album: “Seth Pinnock & A New Thing Live”.

Literary references 
The question "What is man?" from Psalm 8 may have inspired the reflection "What a piece of work is a man" in Shakespeare's Hamlet. Peter Moore contends that Shakespeare was inspired by a paraphrase of Psalm 8 composed by Henry Howard, Earl of Surrey, as he awaited execution in the Tower of London in late 1546 or early 1547. The question also appears as the title of Mark Twain's essay What Is Man?, published anonymously in 1906. The title of a 1974 science fiction short story by American writer Isaac Asimov, ". . . That Thou Art Mindful of Him", is also taken from Psalm 8.

References

Sources

External links 

 Psalm 8 Commentary at TheBibleSays.com
 
 
 Text of Psalm 8 according to the 1928 Psalter
 Psalms Chapter 8 text in Hebrew and English, mechon-mamre.org
 For the leader; "upon the gittith." A psalm of David. / O LORD, our Lord, / how awesome is your name through all the earth! text and footnotes, usccb.org United States Conference of Catholic Bishops
 Psalm 8:1 introduction and text, biblestudytools.com
 Psalm 8 – The Glory of God in Creation enduringword.com
 Psalm 8 / O Lord our governor, / how glorious is your name in all the world! Church of England
 Psalm 8 at biblegateway.com
 Hymns for Psalm 8 hymnary.org

008
Works attributed to David